Natalia de Molina (born 19 December 1990) is a Spanish actress from Andalusia. Since her film debut in the 2013 dramedy Living Is Easy with Eyes Closed, she has featured in films such as Food and Shelter (for which she won the Goya Award for Best Actress), Quién te cantará, Bye, Schoolgirls and Undercover Wedding Crashers.

Life and career
Natalia de Molina was born on 19 December 1990 in Linares, in the province of Jaén, although she was raised in Granada since age 2. Her uncle is an actor and theatre director and her elder sister Celia is also an actress. She moved to Málaga when she was 18 years old to study performing arts (musical specialisation) at the local , later moving to Madrid before finishing her degree.

She made her feature film debut in David Trueba's 2013 comedy-drama Living Is Easy with Eyes Closed, portraying Belén, an unmarried pregnant woman in Francoist Spain. Her breakout performance earned her the Goya Award for Best New Actress. In 2016, she won the Goya Award for Best Actress for her role as unemployed single mother in Food and Shelter, thereby becoming the youngest actress to win two Goya awards.

Since 2018 she has been a member of the Academy of Motion Picture Arts and Sciences.

Filmography

Film

Television

Accolades

References

External links

1990 births
Living people
Spanish film actresses
21st-century Spanish actresses